The Décarie Interchange is a highway interchange located on the island of Montreal, Quebec, Canada.

Geography
It is one of the busiest interchanges in Montreal as it connects Autoroute 40 (Metropolitan Boulevard; also Trans-Canada Highway) with Autoroute 15 south (Decarie Autoroute) and also provides access to Boulevard Marcel-Laurin (Route 117) and Decarie Boulevard in the borough of Saint-Laurent. Slightly to the west of the interchange is another interchange that is the eastern terminus of Autoroute 520 (Cote-de-Liesse Expressway) which merges into Autoroute 40 with a traffic circle, and sometimes considered part of the extended Decarie Interchange region, and marks the western terminus of the Metropolitan Boulevard elevated expressway, which falls to ground level to the west of this.

History 
The Decarie Interchange was constructed from 1960-1964 along the Metropolitan Expressway (A-40), which was opened in 1960, in conjunction with the construction of the Decarie Expressway (A-15). The interchange opened in time for the Expo 67.

It is named after Decarie Boulevard, which the Decarie Autoroute parallels for most of its course. The boulevard is in turn is named after the Décarie family, a prominent Montreal-area family. Its most notable members include Daniel-Jérémie Décarie (1836-1904), who was mayor of Notre-Dame-de-Grâce from 1877 to 1904, and his son, lawyer Jérémie-Louis Décarie (1870-1927), who was a Quebec parliamentarian.

References 

Quebec Autoroutes
Streets in Montreal
Road interchanges in Canada